

Events

January 

 8 January – James Brokenshire resigns as Northern Ireland Secretary on health grounds due to an upcoming lung operation. 
 18 January – Jacob Rees-Mogg is elected chair of the European Research Group.

February 

 6 February – The Alyn and Deeside by-election is held.

April 

 14 April – The UK Independence Party leadership election is decided with Gerard Batten being elected.
 29 April – Amber Rudd resigns as Home Secretary after misleading the Home Affairs Select Committee on deportation targets.
 30 April – Sajid Javid is appointed as the new Home Secretary, becoming the first person from an Asian background to hold one of the Great Offices of State in the UK.

May 

 3 May – Local elections are held across the United Kingdom. Also held is the West Tyrone by-election.
 18 May – A deputy leadership election is begun by the Scottish National Party.
 28 May – A deputy leadership election is held by the Scottish Labour Party. It is won by MP Lesley Laird.

June 

 1 June – The Green Party of England and Wales leadership election begins.
 1 June – The SNP deputy leadership election is concluded, with Keith Brown being elected.
 14 June – A by-election is held in Lewisham East. The seat is held for Labour by Janet Daby.
 18 June – The leadership election for UKIP Wales begins.
 29 June – The leadership election for the Welsh Conservatives begins.

July 

 12–15 July – American President Donald Trump makes his first state visit to the United Kingdom, meeting with Queen Elizabeth II and Prime Minister Theresa May.

August 

 10 August – Gareth Bennett defeats Caroline Jones in the UKIP Wales leadership election.
 31 August – The Green Party of England and Wales leadership election concludes. The winners are Jonathan Bartley and Siân Berry who will job share.

September 

 6 September – Paul Davies defeats Suzy Davies (no relation) in the Welsh Conservatives leadership election.

References 

2018 in British politics
United Kingdom politics and government
Political timelines of the United Kingdom